The Hive may refer to:

Film and television
 The Hive (2008 film), an American film starring Tom Wopat
 The Hive (2014 film), an English film starring Gabriel Basso
 The Hive (2021 film), a Belgian film starring Ludivine Sagnier
 The Hive (Resident Evil), an underground lab in the 2002 film Resident Evil
 "The Hive" (Stargate Atlantis), an episode in the television series Stargate Atlantis
 Hive (Transformers), a group of characters in The Transformers TV cartoon
 The Hive (TV series), a 2010 animated kids series
 Hive (comics), a Marvel Comics villain and character on Agents of S.H.I.E.L.D.

Literature
 The Hive (Cela novel), (1950) by Spanish author Camilo José Cela
 The Hive (novella), (2004) by Star Wars author Steven Barnes
 The Hive (Card and Johnston novel), (2019) a novel in Orson Scott Card's Ender's Game series
 The Hive, a fictional entity in the Deltora Quest series

Places
 The Hive, nickname of the Charlotte Coliseum
 The Hive Stadium, a football and Rugby League stadium in London, home to Barnet F.C. and the London Broncos
 The Hive (studio), a communal living space/recording studio run by the band 311
 The Hive, Worcester, a library and archival centre in  Worcester, England
 The HIVE, a multimedia arts and technology centre in Mumbai, India
 The Hive, Singapore, a building in Singapore
 The Hive, colloquial name of the Sontag Center for Collaborative Creativity at the Claremont Colleges

Video games
 The Hive, home of the Aliens in the computer game Aliens versus Predator 2
 The Hive (video game), a game released for PC and PlayStation in 1995
The Hive, one of the four alien enemy factions found in the video game Destiny

Other uses
 The Hive (website), a once-popular web site for the discussion of the chemistry of mind-altering drugs
 The Hive, an online component of Vanity Fair

See also
 Hive (disambiguation)
 The Hives, a Swedish rock band